"The Valley" is a song by Canadian R&B singer Keshia Chanté and the first single from her currently unnamed album. This is the first release from Chante since her 2011 album Night & Day.

On November 10, 2016, BET premiered the song worldwide.

References	

2016 songs
2016 singles
Keshia Chanté songs